Culex (Culiciomyia) bahri is a species of mosquito belonging to the genus Culex. It is known to be endemic to Sri Lanka and occurrence from Indonesia is not clear.

References

External links
Redescription of four Oriental species of Culex
Culiciomyia Theobald, 1907 - Mosquito Taxonomic Inventory

bahri
Insects described in 1914